Totley is a suburb on the extreme southwest of the City of Sheffield, in South Yorkshire, England. Lying in the historic county boundaries of Derbyshire, Totley was amalgamated into the city of Sheffield in 1933, and is today part of the Dore and Totley electoral ward in the city, though it remains close to the contemporary county boundary of Derbyshire. Totley had a population of 7,963 in 2011. Totley was shown at the 2011 census as being part of the ward of Dore and Totley.

Totley was mentioned in the Domesday Book of 1086 as Totinglee, the name meaning a forest clearing belonging to Tota (probably the Saxon lord). Totley Hall, built in 1623 and enlarged in the 19th century, was converted to a teacher training college in the 1950s and was latterly part of Sheffield Hallam University.

Through the district run the Totley Brook and the Old Hay Brook, which are the two sources of the River Sheaf. Totley also lends its name to Totley Tunnel, the longest underland rail tunnel in the United Kingdom. This takes the Sheffield to Manchester line from Totley underneath the Totley Moor to Grindleford in Derbyshire.

History and geography
Totley was first referred to in the Domesday Survey, commissioned by William the Conqueror. It was then referred to as Totinglei.
It has since had many a different spellings:
1086 Totinglei
1221 Totenleg
1234 Totingly
1275 Tottle
1293 Totleye
1320 Toteleye
1476 Tottynley
1487 Totteley
1585 Tottley
1629 Totles
1641 Tottingley

The Domesday book says this:
- In Totinglei, Tolf had IV bovates of land hidable. Land for one plough. It is waste, wood, pasturable, 1 mile in length and half a mile in breadth. T.R.E. value X shillings now XII pence.

The area of Totley in 1086 was quite small, but by 1839 had grown seven-fold. The borders of Totley are agreed to be the Old Hay Brook, Totley Brook, Brown Edge, Lady Cross, Stony Ridge, along Hathersage Road and Blacka Dike.
The lowest point is the junction between Old Hay Brook and Totley Brook (beginning of the River Sheaf) at 400 ft, the highest point is Flask Edge at 1300 ft.

The underground is rich, and Totley Brick Works still produce bricks and ceramics to this day.

At one time, Totley was one of the townships in the Hundred of Scarsdale, a sub-division of the county of Derbyshire. In 1934 Totley, along with Dore and Bradway became part of Hallam Ward, part of the City of Sheffield and the West Riding of Yorkshire.

Totley is made of Totley Village (Hillfoot Road and Totley Hall Lane), Totley Moor (unpopulated), Totley Bents (Penny Lane), New Totley (called as such since the 30s) and Totley Rise (Baslow Road shops and Lower Bradway Bank).

Cannon Hall

Although there is little proof, there are assumptions that the hall was present in 829. One hypothesis concerning the name of the hall is that it once belonged to the Canons of Beauchief. Parish and council records show that the Pearsons family has lived in Totley since at least 1550 and still live in the village. Samuel Pearson farmed the area in 1550. In 1897, George Creswick bought the house and the land.

Totley Hall

Totley Hall is generally believed to date back to at least 1623, as this date is carved over the Tudor arched doorway on the building's main facade. The carvings bear the characters GN 1623 WM, which seems to mean George Newbould. However the hall was the home of the Barker family, who were the squires of Dore and Totley for many generations. Which also seems to suggest the construction of the  hall could have been commissioned by Edward Barker of Dore Hall, the current squire in 1623. The Barker family left their coat of arms above the fireplace in the main entrance lobby. The hall passed out of the ownership of the Barker family in the late 18th century. The hall was extended by John Dodsley Webster in 1883 and 1894.
According to maps, fields have existed before this date as well as small buildings which would have been farm buildings.

In 1791, Andrew Gallimore left the estate to his niece Hannah, wife of the Rev. D'Ewes Coke of Nottinghamshire. Coke died in 1811, and his son, another D'Ewes Coke, took over the hall and provided money for the construction of the infant school. The family sold the Totley Hall in 1881 to W.K. Marples for £2250. It is at this period that the hall and the farm became two distinct properties.

William Aldam Milner built the lodge on Totley Hall Lane in 1887. His son was killed in World War I and as a sign of thanks the saddened community gave land and £2000 to build a new church. All Saints church opened in 1924. Milner died in 1931.  The hall with 160 acres of land was bought by Sheffield Corporation for £5850 in July 1944. Until 1999, Totley Hall was owned by Sheffield Polytechnic which became Sheffield Hallam University in 1991. Sheffield Hallam University sold the property to developers who converted the hall into luxury apartments.

The Old School House
The Infant School was built in 1821. The first contingent of pupils were 11 boys and 19 girls as well as one school mistress. Hannal Wild taught there in 1833; in 1852 Ann Padley took over and stayed for 20 years.

Totley Grange
Totley Grange was built between 1883 and 1888 by Thomas Earnshaw, together with its Lodge, on the land which he had purchased north of the Baslow to Sheffield turnpike road. He also built stables, a stable yard and a coach house, accessed via Butts Hill past Cannon Hill farm, together with a range of glasshouses within the walled garden.                                                                                                                                    An indenture dated 2nd of April 1875 confirmed absolute sale by Thomas Andrews to Thomas Earnshaw of land and hereditaments at Totley of more than two acres bounded to the north and east by land of Ebenezer Hall and to the south by the turnpike road. On 31 December 1875 the freehold was conveyed to Thomas Earnshaw at a cost of £946.17 shillings and sixpence. Another conveyance between Ebenezer Hall to Thomas Earnshaw was of the freehold ground, buildings and hereditaments dated 27 March 1878 of a little over 3 acres, which included Moorview house and the six cottages of Shrewsbury Terrace. The land abutted Thomas Earnshaw’s previous purchase to the south. It was on this land, that between 1883 and 1888 Thomas Earnshaw built Totley Grange and its Lodge.   In March 1879 Thomas Earnshaw purchased an acre of land from Helen and Charles Beckett which included a dwelling house (subsequently demolished) and the terrace of houses facing the Cross Scythes public house; to which he added Grange Terrace, a row of eight houses.

Additionally, from John Howard, Thomas Earnshaw purchased land to the east of the 1 acre plot, of a little over 4 acres, which subsequently became the site of the Totley Primary School. During the Second World War Totley Grange was used for essential war work by JG Graves, assembling wire bundles for a range of aircraft. In 1948 the trustees of the Thomas Earnshaw trust converted Totley Grange into five flats. Finally in 1965 Totley Grange, the Lodge and all of the outbuildings and gardens, amounting to approximately 6 acres were purchased by George Wimpey and it is on this land the Totley Grange estate of 65 houses was built.

Industry
As a rural village the main industry has historically been agriculture, and several farms remain in Totley today. As well as agriculture, the brooks running through the village have been used as a source of power for small industrial operations since at least the 17th century. In particular, several mills have stood on Old Hay Brook, engaged in activities such as lead smelting, corn grinding, blade manufacture and paper rolling.
The only industry still open is the Totley Brick Works on Baslow Road. This plant supplied the bricks for the construction of Totley Tunnel and currently produces heat-resistant bricks from materials mined outside of the area.  .

References

External links

Suburbs of Sheffield
Towns and villages of the Peak District